Flavio Faggioni (born August 18, 1981) is an Italian ice hockey player. He is currently playing with Meran/Merano of the Austrian lower leagues.

Faggioni competed at the 2007 IIHF World Championship as a member of the Italy national ice hockey team.

References

External links

1981 births
Living people
Italian ice hockey centres
Ice hockey people from Bolzano